Giorgos Katsaros (born on 7 March 1934 in Corfu) is a famous Greek musician and songwriter. He plays the alto saxophone. He has made a variety of recordings, collaborating amongst others with Greek musical composers and singers, such as Yannis Theodoridis, Nana Mouskouri, and Mimis Plessas.

In 1972 he wrote the music for Alekos Sakellarios' I Komissa tis Kerkyras ( The Countess of Corfu).

He is currently the art director of the Municipal Symphonic Orchestra of Athens.

Personal life
He has served as a Board Member for Panathinaikos, the team he is a supporter of.

References

1934 births
Living people
Greek songwriters
Greek film score composers
Male film score composers
Musicians from Corfu
Greek saxophonists
Panteion University alumni
20th-century saxophonists
21st-century saxophonists
21st-century male musicians
20th-century male musicians
Eurovision commentators